Centerville is a city in Turner County, South Dakota, United States. The population was 918 at the 2020 census. Centerville is part of the Sioux Falls, South Dakota metropolitan area.

History
Centerville was platted in 1883. It was named due to its location between Parker and Vermillion.

One of the most powerful tornadoes in the 2003 South Dakota tornado outbreak was located around Centerville and was rated an F-2 on the Fujita scale. It had maximum winds of 135 miles per hour and caused damage in the town of Centerville and surrounding areas. No fatalities were reported with this tornado. Along with the F-2 tornado that was reported, 19 other tornadoes touched down within a 50-mile radius of Centerville.

Geography
Centerville is located at  (43.117631, -96.960644).

Centerville has been assigned the ZIP code 57014 and the FIPS place code 11060.

Climate

Demographics

2010 census
As of the census of 2010, there were 882 people, 374 households, and 231 families living in the city. The racial makeup of the city was 98.2% White, 0.3% African American, 0.6% Native American, 0.2% Asian, 0.1% from other races, and 0.6% from two or more races. Hispanic or Latino of any race were 1.2% of the population.

There were 374 households, of which 27.5% had children under the age of 18 living with them, 50.5% were married couples living together, 6.4% had a female householder with no husband present, 4.8% had a male householder with no wife present, and 38.2% were non-families. 34.2% of all households were made up of individuals, and 17.9% had someone living alone who was 65 years of age or older. The average household size was 2.27 and the average family size was 2.91.

The median age in the city was 39.9 years. 23.9% of residents were under the age of 18; 8% were between the ages of 18 and 24; 22.5% were from 25 to 44; 24.7% were from 45 to 64; and 20.9% were 65 years of age or older. The gender makeup of the city was 50.0% male and 50.0% female.

2000 census
As of the census of 2000, there were 910 people, 387 households, and 236 families living in the city. The population density was 1,265.9 people per square mile (488.0/km2). There were 429 housing units at an average density of 596.8 per square mile (230.1/km2). The racial makeup of the city was 99.34% White, 0.11% Native American, 0.11% Asian, and 0.44% from two or more races. Hispanic or Latino of any race were 0.66% of the population.

There were 387 households, out of which 26.1% had children under the age of 18 living with them, 50.9% were married couples living together, 6.7% had a female householder with no husband present, and 38.8% were non-families. 35.4% of all households were made up of individuals, and 22.5% had someone living alone who was 65 years of age or older. The average household size was 2.23 and the average family size was 2.90.

In the city, the population was spread out, with 23.6% under the age of 18, 6.3% from 18 to 24, 22.2% from 25 to 44, 20.2% from 45 to 64, and 27.7% who were 65 years of age or older. The median age was 44 years. For every 100 females, there were 87.2 males. For every 100 females age 18 and over, there were 81.9 males.

The median income for a household in the city was $29,615, and the median income for a family was $39,643. Males had a median income of $27,171 versus $20,000 for females. The per capita income for the city was $17,089. About 4.2% of families and 8.2% of the population were below the poverty line, including 2.3% of those under age 18 and 19.1% of those age 65 or over.

Notable people
 Clinton P. Anderson, Representative and Senator from New Mexico and Secretary of Agriculture, was born in Centerville.
 Ivan Dmitri (1900 – 1968), famous artist and photographer, was born in Centerville and lived there before moving with his family to North Dakota.

References

Cities in South Dakota
Cities in Turner County, South Dakota
Sioux Falls, South Dakota metropolitan area
Populated places established in 1894